User Data Header (UDH) is a binary structure which may be present at the start of a short message in the Short Message Service in GSM. It does not contain any text, but it specifies how the message should be formatted and processed.

UDH can be used to form Concatenated SMS, to enrich the content of the message with colors, text formatting, small pictures and animations and simple music which are used in Enhanced Messaging Service (EMS), to convey port numbers which may cause start of an application in the mobile phone, which is used for Multimedia Messaging Service (MMS) or to indicate using of national language shift tables.

UDH is defined in 3GPP 23.040 (originally GSM 03.40).

Technical Realization 

Presence of User Data Header is indicated by the TP-UDHI (Transfer Layer Protocol User Data Header Indicator) bit - 6th bit of the first octet of the GSM 03.40 or 3GPP 23.040 message.

If UDH is present, it is at the beginning of the TP-UD (TP-User Data) field and it always starts with an UDHL (UDH Length) octet. The rest of UDH is a sequence of Tag-Length-Value triplets. The Tag is named Information-Element-Identifier (IEI) and is always 1 octet long, the Length octet is always 1 octet long and it specifies the length of the Information Element Data.

UDH uses space intended for the message payload. The longer the UDH, the less space remains for the message text or other contents. When TP-UD contains seven-bit data, the length of TP-UD is given in septets (but UDHL is still in octets, so length in septets is (UDHL + 1) * 8 / 7) and the UDH is filled to a septet boundary with 0-6 zero bits. The next table shows how a TP-UD of a message in the GSM 7 bit default alphabet containing text 'Hi' with a predefined sound 'Chord high' will be encoded:

The total message length TP-UDL will be 8. (UDH has 8 * (1 + 4) = 40 bits, 2 bits is the padding as (40 + 2) / 7 = 6 without remainder, 2 * 7 = 14 bits for text; total TP-UD length is 40 + 2 + 14 = 56 bits = 7 octets = 8 septets.)

UDH Information Elements

Use in Other Protocols 

The UDH is used in other protocols for short message transport - Short Message Peer-to-Peer (SMPP), Universal Computer Protocol (UCP) and in WEMT teleservice in CDMA2000.

See also

 Short Message Service
 GSM 03.38
 Enhanced Messaging Service
 Multimedia Messaging Service
 Short Message Peer-to-Peer
 Universal Computer Protocol

References

GSM standard